The 1941 Maine Black Bears football team was an American football team that represented the University of Maine as a member of the Maine Intercollegiate Athletic Conference (MIAC) and the New England Conference during the 1941 college football season. The team compiled an overall record of  3–2–2 with marks of 1–1–1 against MIAC opponents and 2–1–1 in New England Conference play. The team played its home games at Alumni Field in Orono, Maine. 

George E. "Eck" Allen was hired as Maine's head football coach in January 1941. He replaced Fred Brice who resigned from the post after the 1940 season. Bill Kenyon and Bill Dobbs were assistant coaches. Fullback Edward Barrows, the son of former Maine Governor Lewis O. Barrows, was Maine's 1941 team captain.

Schedule

References

Maine
Maine Black Bears football seasons
Maine Black Bears football